Jane Smith may refer to:

Sports
 Jane Smith (field hockey) (born 1969), British Olympic field hockey player
 Jane Smith (footballer), former association football player for New Zealand
 Jane Smith (diver) (born 1975), British Olympic diver

Others
 Jane Lawrence (1915–2005), married name Jane Lawrence Smith, American actress and opera singer
 Hilda Worthington Smith (Jane Smith, 1888–1984), social worker and labor education specialist
 Jane Idleman Smith, scholar of Islam
 Jane Stewart Smith, Scottish painter and draughtswoman

 Jane Smith, a fictional character played by Angelina Jolie in the film Mr. & Mrs. Smith

See also
 Sarah Jane Smith, fictional character from the Dr. Who TV series
 Jane Lomax-Smith (born 1950), South Australian politician
 Jane Slack-Smith (born 1966), Australian cyclist